Napindan is one of the 28 barangays of Taguig, Metro Manila, Philippines. It is located to the northeastern portion of the city surrounded by Pasig to the north, Taytay in the province of Rizal to the east, Barangay Ibayo Tipas to the west and Laguna de Bay to the south. Circumferential Road 6 traverses barangay Napindan and connects Taytay and Pasig to Taguig.

References 

Taguig
Barangays of Metro Manila